This is a list of notable punk rock bands beginning with the numbers 0–9 and letters A through K. The bands listed have played some type of punk music at some point in their career, although they may have also played other styles. Bands who played in a style that influenced early punk rock—such as garage rock and protopunk—but never played punk rock themselves, are not on this list. Bands who created a new genre that was influenced by (but is not a subgenre of) punk rock—such as alternative rock, crossover thrash, grunge, metalcore, new wave, and post-punk—but never played punk rock, are not listed either.

0–9

A

B

C

D

E

F

G

H

I

J

K

References